The United Arab Emirates women's national volleyball team represents the United Arab Emirates in international women's volleyball competitions and friendly matches.

The team appeared at the GCC Women's Games several times.

References

National women's volleyball teams
Volleyball
Volleyball in the United Arab Emirates
Women's sport in the United Arab Emirates